Jin Yongde (born 14 February 1986) is a Chinese sport shooter. In 2014 he won the 25 m center fire pistol team event at the Asian Games.

References

External links

Asian Games medalists in shooting
Shooters at the 1998 Asian Games
Shooters at the 2002 Asian Games
Shooters at the 2010 Asian Games
Shooters at the 2014 Asian Games
Medalists at the 1998 Asian Games
Medalists at the 2002 Asian Games
Medalists at the 2010 Asian Games
Medalists at the 2014 Asian Games
Chinese male sport shooters
1986 births
Living people
Asian Games gold medalists for China
Asian Games silver medalists for China
Asian Games bronze medalists for China
ISSF pistol shooters
21st-century Chinese people